Brezovac may refer to:

 Brezovac, Aranđelovac, Serbia
 Brezovac, Bjelovar-Bilogora County, a village near Bjelovar, Croatia
 Brezovac, Karlovac County, a village near Rakovica, Croatia
 Brezovac Dobroselski, Croatia
 Brezovac, Sisak-Moslavina County, a village near Novska, Croatia
 Brezovac Žumberački, Croatia

People with the surname
Brigita Brezovac (born 1979), Slovenian professional bodybuilder

See also
 Brezovec (disambiguation)
 Brezovica (disambiguation)